is a Japanese curler from Nagano. She is the skip of the Chubu Electric Power curling team, which won the Japan Curling Championships in both 2017 and 2019. At the international level, she has represented Japan twice at the World Women's Curling Championship and the 2019 Pacific-Asia Curling Championships, where she won a silver medal.

Career
Ishigooka and her team of Chiaki Matsumura, Emi Shimizu, Ikue Kitazawa and Seina Nakajima broke onto the national stage during the 2016–17 season when the team won the 2017 Japan Curling Championships. After suffering defeats to the Satsuki Fujisawa rink in both the round robin and 1 vs. 2 page playoff games, the team, representing Chubu Electric Power, edged Fujisawa by a score of 7–5 in the final game. Although they won the national championship, the team did not compete in the 2017 World Women's Curling Championship as Team Fujisawa failed to finish in the top two at the 2016 Pacific-Asia Curling Championships. Also during the 2016–17 season, Team Matsumura finished runner-up at the 2016 Canad Inns Women's Classic World Curling Tour event, falling in the final to Rachel Homan.

In September 2017, the 2017 Japanese Olympic Curling Trials were held between Japan's top two rinks, Loco Solare (Satsuki Fujisawa) and Chubu Electric Power (Matsumura) to determine Japan's representative in the women's event for the 2018 Winter Olympics. After splitting the first two games, Team Fujisawa won the next two games to secure a 3–1 victory in the best-of-five series. At the 2018 national championship, Team Matsumura could not defend their title as they fell in the semifinal game to Fujikyu (Tori Koana).

The following season, the team altered their lineup, with Seina Nakajima becoming the new skip. On the tour, the team reached the final of the Hokkaido Bank Curling Classic and the semifinals of both the Red Deer Curling Classic and the Karuizawa International. At the 2019 Japan Championship, the team went undefeated through the round robin with a perfect 8–0 record. They then defeated Loco Solare again in the 1 vs. 2 game to advance to the final, where they again faced Fujisawa. In the final, Team Nakajima took four in the fifth end followed by a steal of three in the sixth, aiding them in securing their second Japanese championship. By winning the Japanese championship, Ishigooka and teammates Seina Nakajima, Ikue Kitazawa, Chiaki Matsumura and Emi Shimizu represented Japan at the 2019 World Women's Curling Championship. It was Ishigooka's first international curling event. At the world championships, the team squeaked into the playoffs with a 6–6 record, before upsetting the third place Russian team in the quarterfinals. They then lost to Sweden in the semifinal, and lost to South Korea in the bronze medal game, settling for fourth place.

Ishigooka and her team represented Japan at the 2019 Pacific-Asia Curling Championships in Shenzhen, China the following season. After going 6–1 in the round robin and defeating Hong Kong in the semifinal, they lost in the final to China's Han Yu. The team lost in the final of the Advics Cup at the start of the season, and reached the semifinals of the International Bernese Ladies Cup. At the 2020 Japan Curling Championships, Team Nakajima once again went undefeated through the round robin with an 8–0 record. They then lost in the 1 vs. 2 game to Fujisawa, before bouncing back with a semifinal victory over Hokkaido Bank Fortius (Sayaka Yoshimura). In a tight final game, Loco Solare scored a single in an extra end to win the national championship by a final score of 7–6.

Team Nakajima played in no World Curling Tour events during the abbreviated 2020–21 season as there were no events held in Japan or Asia. The team would compete in their national championship, held from February 7 to 14, 2021 in Wakkanai, Hokkaido. The team posted a 4–2 record through the round robin of the national championship, earning them a spot in the 3 vs. 4 page playoff game. After defeating Fujikyu in the 3 vs. 4, they lost in the semifinal to Hokkaido Bank Fortius, eliminating them from contention.

Back on tour for the 2021–22 season, Team Nakajima finished third at the 2021 Hokkaido Bank Curling Classic. Because Team Fujisawa won the 2021 Japanese Olympic Curling Trials and were representing Japan at the 2022 Winter Olympics, a world championship trial was held between Chubu Electric Power, Fujikyu and Hokkaido Bank Fortius to determine who would represent Japan at the 2022 World Women's Curling Championship. Chubu Electric posted a 3–1 record in the qualifying round, earning them a spot in the best-of-three final against Yoshimura. After splitting the first two games, the Nakajima rink took one in the tenth end of the final game to earn the berth as Team Japan at the World Championship. The team altered their lineup for the World Championship, naming Ikue Kitazawa the new skip of the team. In Prince George, British Columbia, Canada for the Worlds, the Japanese team again went 6–6 through the round robin, however, it was not enough to qualify for the playoff round, and they placed seventh.

Personal life
Ishigooka is employed as an office worker.

Teams

References

External links

Chubu Electric Power
Kazuizawa Curling Club: Official site (in Japanese)
Video: 

Living people
1996 births
Japanese female curlers
Pacific-Asian curling champions
Japanese curling champions
People from Aomori (city)
People from Nagano (city)
Sportspeople from Aomori Prefecture
Sportspeople from Nagano Prefecture
20th-century Japanese women
21st-century Japanese women